Adenochlaena is a genus of plant of the family Euphorbiaceae first described as a genus in 1858. It is native to certain islands in the Indian Ocean.

Species
 Adenochlaena leucocephala Baill. - Madagascar, Comoros
 Adenochlaena zeylanica (Baill.) Thwaites - Sri Lanka

formerly included
moved to other genera  (Cladogynos Epiprinus Koilodepas )
 A. calycina - Koilodepas calycinum  
 A. indica - Epiprinus mallotiformis 
 A. mallotiformis - Epiprinus mallotiformis 
 A. siamensis - Cladogynos orientalis  
 A. siletensis - Epiprinus siletianus

References

Epiprineae
Euphorbiaceae genera
Biota of the Indian Ocean
Taxa named by Henri Ernest Baillon